Iraqi Oil Tanker Company (IOTC) is the state owned Iraqi company specializing in the ocean transport of crude oil and refined products. It was established in 1972.

External links

Iraqi Oil Tanker Company (official website)

Companies of Iraq
Tanker shipping companies
Shipping companies of Iraq
Iraqi companies established in 1972
Transport companies established in 1972